Mickley is a cluster of small settlements and former civil parish, now in the parish of Prudhoe, in the Tyne Valley, between Prudhoe and Stocksfield in the English county of Northumberland, England. It lies south of the River Tyne and is accessible via the A695. The electoral ward of Mickley comprises the hamlets of Mickley Square, West Mickley (including Mount Pleasant), High Mickley, plus Cherryburn and Eltringham Farm. The population is a little under one thousand. In 1951 the parish had a population of 1862.

The Mickley settlements are served by St George's Church, which was built in 1830. Other facilities in Mickley include a garden centre, two social clubs, a deli and a cafe on the A695. There is a public house (The Blue Bell Inn), dating from the 1820s, at Mount Pleasant.

History 
Thomas Bewick, wood-engraver and author of A History of British Birds, the first practical field guide, was born in 1753 at Cherryburn House, just north of Mickley Square. Cherryburn House is now a National Trust site.

There were several collieries in Mickley. Mickley Moor Colliery operated from 1766 till about 1781. Its successor, Mickley Colliery, was just below Mickley Square: it operated from the 1950s until the 1940s. There were also drift mines at West Mickley, and in the woods to the East of Mickley Square.   

This village once also produced "Mickley bricks," which can still be found in neighbouring areas. The brick kiln remains at the lower end of Mickley.

Governance 
Mickley was formerly a township and chapelry in Ovingham parish, from 1866 Mickley was a civil parish in its own right until it was abolished on 1 April 1974 and merged with Prudhoe.

Notable people 
 Thomas Bewick: see above.
 Joe Tulip, professional footballer with Queen of the South F.C. in the club's days in Scotland's top division
 Bob Stokoe, professional footballer and later manager, who won an FA Cup winners medal as a player with Newcastle United In 1955, and later managed Sunderland to victory in the same competition in 1973.
 Fred Liddle, professional footballer with Queens Park Rangers, Huddersfield Town, Rotherham United, Newcastle United, Gillingham, Coventry City and Exeter City between 1927 and 1939

References

External links

Mickley photos
Mickley map

Villages in Northumberland
Former civil parishes in Northumberland
Prudhoe